The Art Directors Guild Award for Excellence in Production Design for an Animated Film is one of the annual awards given by the Art Directors Guild starting from 2017.

Winners and nominees

2010s

2020s

References

Art Directors Guild Awards
2020s in American cinema